General Walden may refer to:

Hiram Walden (1800–1880), New York State Militia major general
John Butler Walden (1939–2002), Tanzanian People's Defence Force major general
Rudolf Walden (1878–1946), Finnish general